Emily Hope Morse (born June 2, 1970) is an American sex therapist, author and media personality. She is the host of the long-running podcast Sex with Emily and is also known for her 2012 recurring reality television appearance in Bravo's series Miss Advised (2012).

Career
Morse has appeared as a guest expert on many radio and television shows, and has been featured in The New York Times, The Los Angeles Times, and San Francisco Chronicle for her expertise in sex and relationships. Her first book Hot Sex: Over 200 Things You Can Try Tonight was released in October 2011. Morse has also acted in, produced, and directed the film, for which she received an award. Her podcast, Sex with Emily, has been in production since 2005.

In 2012 Morse began a four-year run as guest co-host on the nationally syndicated Loveline Radio Show with Dr. Drew Pinsky.

Morse contributes frequently to many major online publications including Glamour, Cosmopolitan, Ask Men, Popsugar, Pattiknows.com, Men's Health, and Harper's Bazaar.

In 2014, Morse became the host of the regularly-recurring Sexual Health Expo. Morse also serves as the sexual health expert for Lifestyles.

In 2021, The New York Times ran an article, posting the question: "Is Emily Morse the Dr. Ruth of a new generation?"

Education
Morse holds two bachelor's degrees from the University of Michigan in psychology and political science. 
Morse attended Institute for Advanced Study of Human Sexuality in San Francisco and received a certificate as doctor in human sexuality.

Books

Radio shows
 Sex with Emily (podcast)
 Loveline Radio (special guest co-host)
 Sirius XM

Television series
 Miss Advised, airing on Bravo (premiered June 18, 2012)

Film 
 See How They Run (2003) Morse produced & directed
 I am a Sex Addict, 2005, Morse acted

References

Further reading

External links

 
 

Living people
Sex therapists
Actresses from the San Francisco Bay Area
Film directors from California
American documentary film directors
University of Michigan College of Literature, Science, and the Arts alumni
Institute for Advanced Study of Human Sexuality alumni
American erotica writers
Writers from the San Francisco Bay Area
Radio personalities from Michigan
Participants in American reality television series
Sex educators
Film directors from Michigan
1970 births
American television actresses
American women documentary filmmakers
21st-century American women